Club van 100 (English: Club of 100) is the official list of Football players who have appeared in one hundred or more official matches for AFC Ajax.

Club van 100
The Club van 100 is the official list of Football players who have appeared in one hundred or more official matches for AFC Ajax. The club currently has a total of 174 members with Edson Álvarez being the latest addition. The record for league appearances is held by Mr. Ajax himself Sjaak Swart, who appeared in 463 league matches for Ajax 1. There is a beneficiary team called Lucky Ajax, which was initiated by Sjaak Swart. Lucky Ajax participate in at least one match a year, usually in the name of charity, and commonly at football ceremonies to bid farewell to retiring players. One of the prerequisites for playing on Lucky Ajax, which is invitational only, is that you are a member of the Club van 100, having made at least 100 official match appearances for Ajax Amsterdam in the first team of the club.

Out of the current selection, a total of 5 players are in the Club van 100. These include Daley Blind, Maarten Stekelenburg, Davy Klaassen, Dušan Tadić, Edson Álvarez.

Members list

The table below is a list of the Club van 100 members, sorted by total appearances.

This list is accurate as of last match played on 3 September 2022, AFC Ajax - SC Cambuur.

Nationalities

Total caps of current squad
{| class="vatop"
|
 

This list is accurate as of last match played on 3 September 2022, AFC Ajax - SC Cambuur.

See also
List of AFC Ajax players
List of AFC Ajax records and statistics

References

Club van 100